Thomas Henry Ashton, 4th Baron Ashton of Hyde,  (born 18 July 1958), has served as a Minister in HM Government since 2014 and by profession is an insurance broker. He succeeded to his family's peerage title on 2 August 2008.

Education and career
Henry Ashton went to Eton College and Trinity College, Oxford. He was commissioned in the Royal Hussars, later becoming a Lieutenant in the Royal Wessex Yeomanry. Ashton worked as an insurance broker and held the position of Chief Executive Officer at Berkshire Hathaway-owned Lloyd's firms Faraday Underwriting Ltd, and Faraday Reinsurance Co. Ltd, from 2005 until 2013. From 2010 to 2013 Lord Ashton was a member of the Council of Lloyd's.

Elected a representative hereditary peer in July 2011, Ashton sits in the House of Lords as a Conservative. In the July 2014 government reshuffle he was appointed a Lord-in-waiting and Whip in the Lords by Prime Minister David Cameron, serving until the 2017 general election. In July 2016 Prime Minister Theresa May appointed him as Parliamentary Under-Secretary of State for the Department for Culture, Media & Sport.

In March 2019, Lord Ashton received international publicity and acclaim for giving a correct and clever definition to Lord Geddes, to the latter's question about the meaning of the term algorithm. Lord Ashton gave the definition as "an algorithm is a set of rules that precisely defines a sequence of operations". The definition was said to "[rival] dictionary entries for clarity and succinctness—wrapped up in a historical allusion that he knew his classically educated interlocutor would understand."

In July 2019, Lord Ashton of Hyde was appointed Chief Whip in the House of Lords by new Prime Minister Boris Johnson.  He was appointed to the Privy Council the following month.

Family
Descended from a cadet branch of the ancient Lancashire Assheton family, he married Emma Louise Allinson, daughter of Colin Allinson and Alison Palmer (née Bartholomew), in 1987; they have four daughters/

As he does not have any sons, the heir presumptive to the family title is his younger brother, Jack Ashton.

See also
 Baron Ashton of Hyde

Arms

References

External links
‘ASHTON OF HYDE’, Who's Who 2018, A & C Black; online edn, Oxford University Press, Dec 2017

1958 births
Living people
People from Gloucestershire
Henry
People educated at Eton College
Alumni of Trinity College, Oxford
4
Conservative Party (UK) Baronesses- and Lords-in-Waiting
Conservative Party (UK) hereditary peers
English financial businesspeople
Government ministers of the United Kingdom
Members of the Privy Council of the United Kingdom
Hereditary peers elected under the House of Lords Act 1999